Francis Edward Wilson (April 20, 1901 – November 25, 1974) nicknamed "Squash", was a professional baseball player. He played all or part of four seasons in Major League Baseball, primarily as a left fielder. He played for the Boston Braves from 1924 to 1926, and the Cleveland Indians and St. Louis Browns in 1928.

External links

Major League Baseball left fielders
Boston Braves players
Cleveland Indians players
St. Louis Browns players
Jersey City Skeeters players
Milwaukee Brewers (minor league) players
Kansas City Blues (baseball) players
Baseball players from Massachusetts
1901 births
1974 deaths